The Oxford Textbook of Medicine is an international textbook of medicine. First published in 1983, it is now in its sixth edition. It is primarily aimed at mature physicians looking for information outside their area of particular expertise, but widely used as a reference source by medical students and doctors in training, and by others seeking authoritative accounts of the science and clinical practice of medicine.

The Oxford Textbook of Medicine is available in print and online - where its contents are systematically updated.

Description

The Oxford Textbook of Medicine covers the scientific aspects and clinical practice of internal medicine and its subspecialties. It offers practical guidance on clinical management and the prevention of disease.

Throughout the book, basic science and clinical practice are integrated, and the implications of research for medical practice are explained. Traditional specialty areas in clinical medicine are covered, and there are sections on the following; bioterrorism and forensic medicine; medical disorders in pregnancy; travel and expedition medicine; nutrition; the use of stem cells; regenerative medicine; and psychiatry and drug related problems in general medical practice.

The fifth edition of this book is different from previous editions, with each chapter including a chapter summary, and all illustrations and photographs now in full colour.

The 6th edition was published in March 2020.

Online Access

The sixth edition of the Oxford Textbook of Medicine is available online from Oxford University Press. The online edition contains the full-text, figures, and illustrations of the print version, as well as links to sources of related and further reading. All figures can be downloaded into PowerPoint.

The online edition of the Oxford Textbook of Medicine will be systematically updated twice a year.

Online access in low and middle income countries is supported by the Wellcome Trust and is made available through the World Health Organisation-led HINARI Access to Research in Health programme.

Editorial Team

The Oxford Textbook of Medicine is edited by:

 David A. Warrell, Emeritus Professor of Tropical Medicine and Honorary Fellow of St Cross College, University of Oxford, UK
 Timothy M. Cox, Professor of Medicine, University of Cambridge; Honorary Consultant Physician, Addenbrooke's Hospital, Cambridge, UK
 John D. Firth, Consultant Physician and Nephrologist, Addenbrooke's Hospital, Cambridge, UK

In total, there are 750 contributors to the textbook.

Contents

 Foreword
 On being a patient
 Modern medicine: foundations, achievements and limitations
 Global patterns of disease and medical practice
 Cell biology
 Immunological mechanisms
 Principles of clinical oncology
 Infection
 Sexually transmitted diseases and sexual health
 Chemical and physical injuries andenvironmental factors and disease
 Clinical pharmacology
 Nutrition
 Metabolic disorders
 Endocrine disorders
 Medical disorders in pregnancy
 Gastroenterology
 Diseases of the liver, biliary tree and pancreas
 Cardiovascular medicine
 Critical care medicine
 Respiratory medicine
 Rheumatology
 Diseases of the skeleton
 Nephrology
 Disorders of the blood
 Diseases of the skin
 Neurology
 The eye
 Psychiatry and drug related problems
 Forensic medicine
 Sports medicine
 Geratology
 Pain medicine
 Palliative medicine
 Laboratory normal values
 Acute medicine

References

External links
 The Oxford Textbook of Medicine
 The catalogue of Oxford University Press

Medical textbooks
1983 non-fiction books